Gudar people or Gaodari  (Persian: گودر; Mazandarani: گودار‎; Gudari: Chule /چوله ),also called Godar, Gojar, Gosar or ‌Xikesh, are a group of the Indo-Turkic people living in Mazandaran Province of Iran.According to Dehkhoda Dictionary, Gudar and Gudarz are the same.

Notable Gudar People

Arzemon Shekarchian,Iranian musician

References

See also
Gurjar
Gudar
Jugi people
Abdal of Turkey

Ethnic groups in Iran
.
Ethnic groups in the Middle East
Indo-Aryan peoples
Stateless nationalism in Asia
Gurjar